The first cabinet of Ion I. C. Brătianu was the government of Romania from 27 December 1908 to 4 March 1909.

Ministers
The ministers of the cabinet were as follows:

President of the Council of Ministers:
Ion I. C. Brătianu (27 December 1908 - 4 March 1909)
Minister of the Interior: 
Ion I. C. Brătianu (27 December 1908 - 4 March 1909)
Minister of Foreign Affairs: 
(interim) Ion I. C. Brătianu (27 December 1908 - 4 March 1909)
Minister of Finance:
Emil Costinescu (27 December 1908 - 4 March 1909)
Minister of Justice:
Toma Stelian (27 December 1908 - 4 March 1909)
Minister of Religious Affairs and Public Instruction:
Spiru Haret (27 December 1908 - 4 March 1909)
Minister of War:
Gen. Alexandru Averescu (27 December 1908 - 4 March 1909)
Minister of Public Works:
Vasile G. Morțun (27 December 1908 - 4 March 1909)
Minister of Industry and Commerce:
Alexandru Djuvara (27 December 1908 - 4 March 1909)
Minister of Agriculture and Property:
Anton Carp (27 December 1908 - 4 March 1909)

References

Cabinets of Romania
Cabinets established in 1908
Cabinets disestablished in 1909
1908 establishments in Romania
1909 disestablishments in Romania